The unspotted tentiform leafminer moth (Parornix geminatella) is a moth of the family Gracillariidae. It is known from Québec, Canada, and Florida, Georgia, Maine, Maryland, New York, Vermont, Texas, Colorado, Missouri, Kentucky and Connecticut in the United States.

The larvae feed on Crataegus species, Cydonia species (including Cydonia oblonga), Malus species (including Malus pumila and Malus sylvestris), Prunus species (including Prunus avium, Prunus cerasus and Prunus serotina) and Pyrus species (including Pyrus communis). They mine the leaves of their host plant. The mine has the form of a tentiform mine under the leaf surface and close to the leaf margin.

References

External links
Parornix at microleps.org

Parornix
Moths of North America
Moths described in 1869